is a Japanese actress and voice actress. She's credited under the name  in products with adult content.  She has been married since her 33rd birthday, and gave birth to her first child on February 14, 2015.

Filmography

Anime
Aokana: Four Rhythm Across the Blue – Madoka Aoyagi
Blood+ – Dismas
Boogiepop Phantom – Rika
Fighting Fantasy Girl Rescue Me: Mave-chan (OAV) – Banshee-chan
Fighting Spirit – Yuuji Date
Fullmetal Alchemist – Sheska
Fullmetal Alchemist the Movie: Conqueror of Shamballa – Sheska
Gad Guard as Mimi
The Idolmaster series (except for Idolmaster: Xenoglossia) – Ritsuko Akizuki
Inuyasha – Kosuke
Kaginado – Kudryavka Noumi
Little Busters! – Kudryavka Noumi
Vandread – Celtic Midori
Vandread Turbulence (OAV) – Celtic Midori
Vandread: The Second Stage – Celtic Midori

Video Games
Puyo Puyo series – Dongurigaeru, Ocean Prince
Identity V - Doctor/Emily Dyer
The Idolmaster series – Ritsuko Akizuki
The Legend of Zelda: Twilight Princess – Additional voices
Chu→ning Lover – Erukueru Alfred
Fate/Grand Order - Britomart

References

External links
 
Naomi Wakabayashi at GamePlaza-Haruka Voice Acting Database 
Naomi Wakabayashi at Hitoshi Doi's Seiyuu Database 

1975 births
Living people
Voice actors from Tottori Prefecture
Japanese voice actresses